Eddie Gutierrez may refer to:

 Eddie Gutierrez (soccer) (born 1983), American soccer player
 Eddie Gutierrez (actor) (born 1942), Filipino actor and former matinee idol